Yury Sergeyevich Osipov (born 7 July 1936) is a Soviet and Russian mathematician. He was elected a full member of the Academy of Sciences of the USSR in 1987 and was a president of its successor, the Russian Academy of Sciences from 17 December 1991 to 29 May 2013.

Biography 
Osipov was born in Tobolsk (in present-day Tyumen Oblast, Russia). In 1959 he graduated from the Department of Mechanics and Mathematics of the Ural State University (Yekaterinburg, Russia). His teacher was Nikolai Krasovsky, famous scientist and founder of the Ural scientific school in mathematical theory of control and the theory of differential games. From 1961 to 1969 he worked at the Ural State University. From 1970 to 1993 he worked at the Institute of Mathematics and Mechanics of the Ural Branch of the USSR Academy of Sciences (later, of the Russian Academy of Sciences) in Yekaterinburg (from 1986 to 1993 he was the chief of the Institute). In 1971 he defended his second thesis and received the rank of professor in 1973. In 1984 he was elected corresponding member and in 1987, full member of the USSR Academy of Sciences (Division of Machine Engineering, Mechanics and Control Processes Problems).

He has been the President of the USSR Academy of Sciences and its successor, the Russian Academy of Sciences, since 1991, having been reelected in 1996, 2001 and 2006. He is also involved in the Russian government, specifically as a member of the Security Council of the Russian Federation.

Since 1993 Osipov has also served as the director of the V. A. Steklov Mathematical Institute in Moscow. He holds a concurrent appointment as a professor of the Moscow State University.

Honours 

 Full member (1987) and the President of the Russian Academy of Sciences (since 1991)
 Lenin Prize (1976)
 Order of the Red Banner of Labour (1981)
 State Prize of Russian Federation (1993)
 Euler Gold Medal of the Russian Academy of Sciences for outstanding results in mathematics and physics (1997)
 Order of Merit for the Fatherland of 3rd (1996), 2nd (1999), 1st (2006) and 4th degree (2013)
 Cyril and Methodius Prize of the Russian Orthodox Church
 Member of the European Academy of Sciences and Arts (see list of its members)
 Order of the Legion of Honour (2003)
 Commandeur of the Legion of Honour (2011)
 Demidov Prize (2010)

References

External links 

 Russian academy of sciences president
 Y. Osipov at the Russian Academy of Sciences web site
 Yury Osipov — scientific works on the website Math-Net.Ru

1936 births
Living people
People from Tobolsk
Demidov Prize laureates
Members of the European Academy of Sciences and Arts
Full Members of the USSR Academy of Sciences
Presidents of the Russian Academy of Sciences
Honorary Members of the Russian Academy of Arts
Members of the Tajik Academy of Sciences
Full Cavaliers of the Order "For Merit to the Fatherland"
Russian mathematicians
Soviet mathematicians
Academic staff of Moscow State University
Ural State University alumni
Academic staff of Ural State University
Recipients of the Order of Prince Yaroslav the Wise, 4th class